John Bobbitt may refer to:

John Wayne Bobbitt (born 1967), American penile amputee
John Franklin Bobbitt (1876–1956), American educationist